James Anthony Hibburt (born 30 October 1979, in Ashford, Surrey) is an English former professional footballer who played in the Football League, as a defender.

Career
Hibburt began his youth career at Crystal Palace and signed professional terms in 1998. He made his senior debut in a 1–0 away win against Norwich City, in April 1999. After one further appearance that season and four in 1999–2000, plus one in the UEFA Intertoto Cup, Hibburt was released by Palace in 2000. He trained with Brentford, under former Palace manager Steve Coppell, and also spent some time with FC Dallas, where he suffered an achilles tendon injury that badly affected his career, before eventually signing with Woking. He subsequently played for Ashford Town.

, he was part of the coaching staff at Bedfont Town.

References

External links
Hibburt at holmesdale.net

1979 births
Living people
People from Ashford, Surrey
English footballers
Association football defenders
Crystal Palace F.C. players
Woking F.C. players
Ashford Town (Middlesex) F.C. players
English Football League players
National League (English football) players